The Journal of Pharmacology and Experimental Therapeutics (a.k.a. JPET) is a peer-reviewed scientific journal covering pharmacology. It has been published since 1909 by the American Society for Pharmacology and Experimental Therapeutics (ASPET). The journal publishes mainly original research articles, and accepts papers covering all aspects of the interactions of chemicals with biological systems.

John Jacob Abel founded ASPET in December 1908 when he invited 18 pharmacologists to his laboratory in order to organize a new society. At the end of the meeting Abel announced the establishment of JPET.

According to the Journal Citation Reports, the journal received a 2021 impact factor of 4.4.

Further reading
Pharm. Exp. Therap. at Hathi Trust
Full free text of volumes 1-25
Contents of volumes 25-215

References

English-language journals
Pharmacology journals
Publications established in 1909
Monthly journals